The Kaimosi blind snake (Afrotyphlops kaimosae) is a species of snake in the family Typhlopidae.

References 

Endemic fauna of Kenya
kaimosae
Reptiles described in 1935